Ubaldo Continiello (4 May 1941 – 20 January 2014) was an Italian composer and conductor.

Life and career 
Born in Monteverde, Avellino, Continiello started his career as a composer of pop songs, for, among others, Tony Del Monaco and Bobby Solo.

He is best known as a composer of musical scores for films; he composed over 40 film scores, mainly for comedy films.

Selected filmography 

 Lola Colt  (1967)
 I due gattoni a nove code... e mezza ad Amsterdam (1973)
 Last Tango in Zagarol (1973)
 Ku-Fu? Dalla Sicilia con furore (1973)
 Il trafficone (1974)
 Farfallon (1974)
 Il giustiziere di mezzogiorno (1975)
 Meet Him and Die (1976)
 Live Like a Cop, Die Like a Man (1976)
 L'affittacamere (1976)
 Ultimo mondo cannibale (1977)
 Gangbuster (1977)
 Last Feelings (1978)
 Voglia di donna (1978)
 La liceale, il diavolo e l'acquasanta (1979)
 Play Motel (1979)
 Blow Job (Soffio erotico) (1980)
 Macabre (1980)
 La liceale al mare con l'amica di papà (1980)
 Paulo Roberto Cotechiño centravanti di sfondamento (1983)

References

External links 
 

 Ubaldo Continiello at Discogs

1941 births
2014 deaths
Italian film score composers
Italian male film score composers
People from the Province of Avellino
20th-century Italian musicians
20th-century Italian male musicians